Mara Superior (born 1951) is an American artist known for her work in ceramics. She attended the University of Connecticut and the University of Massachusetts Amherst.

Collections
Her work is included in the collections of the Smithsonian American Art Museum, the Los Angeles County Museum of Art, the Everson Museum of Art and the Currier Museum of Art.

References

20th-century ceramists
21st-century ceramists
20th-century American women artists
21st-century American women artists
Artists from New York City
Artists in the Smithsonian American Art Museum collection